This is a list of notable alumni of Arizona State University.

Business
Kathleen von Alvensleben – architect and charity fundraiser
Robert Bigelow – hotel and aerospace entrepreneur 
Michael R. Burns – vice chairman of Lionsgate Entertainment Corp.; received the Alumni Achievement Award from the ASU Alumni Association in 2017 
Chris Cohan – founder of Sonic Communications; former NBA owner, Golden State Warriors
Vince Ferraro – VP of Global Strategy and Marketing, Eastman Kodak (2010–present)
Ira A. Fulton – businessman, founder of Fulton Homes (attended)
Bennie Gonzales – architect; received the Founders’ Day Alumni Achievement Award from the ASU Alumni Association in 1970
Derrick Hall – president of the Arizona Diamondbacks; received the Founders’ Day Young Alumni Achievement Award from the ASU Alumni Association in 2003
Robert Hecht-Nielsen – businessman, computer developer and adjunct professor of electrical and computer engineering, University of California-San Diego; received the Founders’ Day Alumni Achievement Award from the ASU Alumni Association in 1994
Wilbur R. Ingalls, Jr. – architect, business owner
Howard Lindzon – author and founder of StockTwits
Allison Maslan – CEO of Blast Off!, executive producer of Allie & You web series 
T. Allen McArtor – chief executive, EADS North America; received the Founders’ Day Alumni Achievement Award from the ASU Alumni Association in 1989
Ioanna Morfessis – helped launch the nation's first "one-stop" business assistance center for small minority business enterprises; inaugural executive director, Phoenix Economic Growth Corporation; founding president and CEO, Greater Phoenix Economic Council; founder, IO. INC consulting practice; honoree for the 2012 Arizona Centennial Legacy Project: Arizona's 48 Most Intriguing Women project
Ted Sarandos – Chief Content Officer at Netflix
Joe Shoen – chairman of Amerco; chairman and president of U-Haul
Kate Spade – fashion designer, business owner
Gary L. Tooker – retired corporate executive; received the Founders' Day Alumni Achievement Award from the ASU Alumni Association in 1983
Ryan Wood, co-founder of the Under Armour company

Arts, literature and entertainment
Dustin Lee Abraham – screenwriter and producer for CSI: Crime Scene Investigation
Ludwig Ahgren – YouTube streamer
Steve Allen – writer, comedian, musician
Alvin Eli Amason – painter and sculptor
Matt Barrie – ESPN anchor
Wes Bergmann – cast member of The Real World: Austin; winner of the Real World/Road Rules Challenge: The Duel
Carolina Bermudez – co-host of Elvis Duran and the Morning Show and TV personality on Showbiz Tonight'
Amanda Brown – author of Legally BlondeTony Carrillo – author of syndicated comic strip F MinusLynda Carter – Miss World USA (1972), actress, singer, and star of the TV series Wonder Woman from 1975 to 1979
Jonni Cheatwood – artist
Rishi Vohra – author
Roger Clyne – lead singer and songwriter for The Refreshments and Roger Clyne and The Peacemakers
Ed Dee – author
Christine Devine – television news anchor based in Los Angeles; received the Founder's Day Alumni Achievement Award from the ASU Alumni Association in 2002
Dan Deublein, Actor from the television series Beverly Hills, 90210.
Jerry Dumas – comics writer and artist of Sam's Strip and Sam and SiloDomo Genesis – rapper, songwriter, and DJ; member of Odd Future (attended)
Dan Greenberg – sports journalist, Barstool Sports
Dustin Hodge - producer, Little Britches Rodeo (TV series) and The Tight Rope
Tyler Hoechlin – actor, 7th Heaven and Teen WolfShanna Hogan – journalist and author (The New York Times bestseller Picture Perfect)
Dan Lam – drip artist
Brandon Kellum – musician, vocalist of the band American Standards
Jimmy Kimmel – actor, comedian, and TV host
Kongos – alternative rock band composed of four brothers, all of whom graduated from ASU
Ladimir "Ladmo" Kwiatkowski – entertainer, co-hosted The Wallace and Ladmo Show; received the Founders’ Day Alumni Achievement Award from the ASU Alumni Association in 1986 (deceased)
Tony Martino – singer/songwriter and record producer from Chicago
Al Michaels – sportscaster for ABC and NBC
Max Miller – YouTuber
Paul "P.H." Naffah – drummer for The Refreshments and Roger Clyne and The Peacemakers; Kappa Sigma
Tyler Niknam – Twitch streamer 
Nick Nolte – actor
Barbara Teller Ornelas - master Navajo weaver and cultural ambassador for the U.S. State Department 
Michaele Pride-Wells (born 1956), architect; B.Arch 1981 
Russ Rhea — television journalist 
Holly Roberts – artist 
Linda Ronstadt – Grammy and Emmy award-winning singer
Andrew Santino – comedian
John Seibel – host of ESPNEWS and SportsNation on ESPN Radio
David Spade – comedian and actor 
Stefan Springman – TV producer, host of the VH1 show Can't Get a DateBrody Stevens – stand-up comedian and actor, star of the Comedy Central show Brody Stevens: Enjoy It!, pitcher for Arizona State University baseball team
Brenda Strong – actress
Ross Thomas – actor, filmmaker
Shayne Topp - Actor known for Smosh and The Goldbergs. 
Maysoon Zayid – Stand up comedian with cerebral palsy

Military
Maj. Gen. William P. Acker – retired major general in the U.S. Air Force; former commander of 3rd Air Force, U.S. Air Forces in Europe, with headquarters at Royal Air Force Station Mildenhall, Suffolk, England
Maj. Gen. John J. Batbie, Jr. – retired major general in the U.S. Air Force; former vice commander, Air Force Reserve Command, Robins Air Force Base, GA
Gen. Philip M. Breedlove – four-star general in the U.S. Air Force
Ryan Cleckner – former army sniper and veterans activist
John C. Keegan – served in both the U.S. Army and the U.S. Navy; retired with the rank of Commander in the U.S. Navy; served as judge of the Justice Court in Maricopa County, Arizona
Gen. John L. Piotrowski – retired U.S. Air Force four-star general who served as Vice Chief of Staff, U.S. Air Force, from 1985 to 1987; former commander-in-chief of the North American Aerospace Defense Command and the U.S. Space Command (attended)
Rick Romley – retiree of the U.S. Marine Corps, Vietnam; elected Maricopa County Attorney in 1989 and served until 2004; currently serves as Interim Maricopa County Attorney following his appointment by the Maricopa County Board of Supervisors
Eldon Rudd – retiree of the U.S. Marine Corps; served as a fighter pilot during World War II; served 20 years in the FBI on assignments in Latin America, Washington, D.C. and Phoenix; elected to U.S. House of Representatives from Arizona's 4th District in 1976, where he served until retirement in 1987 (deceased)
Brig. Gen. Michael A. Ryan – retired general in the U.S. Army
Jeremy Staat – retiree of the U.S. Marine Corps; Iraqi War veteran; NFL professional athlete; founder of the Jeremy Staat Foundation, which works to prevent veteran suicide
Margaret H. Woodward – major general in the U.S. Air Force, one of the commanders of Operation Odyssey Dawn
Daniel Yoo (military officer) Commander of MARSOC

Miscellaneous
Keith Andrews – bishop of the Diocese of Western Anglicans
Alicia-Monique Blanco – Miss Arizona USA 2009
Linda Burnes Bolton – past president of the American Academy of Nursing 
Thom Brooks – political philosopher and legal scholar
Angela Bryan – Professor of Psychology and Neuroscience at the University of Colorado Boulder, health psychologist conducting HIV/STD and cannabis research
Greg Byrne – University of Alabama Athletic Director
Bradley Cardinale - ecologist, conservation biologist, academic and researcher
Temple Grandin – animal behavior expert, author, autism advocate
Dwayne D. Gremler -  social scientist, academic, and author. 
Barb Honchak - professional Mixed Martial Artist, inaugural Invicta FC Flyweight Champion, currently competing in the UFC
Tania Israel - expert in LGBTQ intervention research and dialogue across political disagreement
Michael I. Jordan – computer scientist and researcher, MS in Mathematics (Statistics) from ASU (1980)
Mary Kay Letourneau - child rapist convicted of raping a 12 year old student whom she was teaching.
Paul F. McMillan – chemist and high pressure scientist, Professor at University College London
Kevin Nee – professional strongman
Scott Peterson - convicted murderer (2004), currently serving life sentence at San Quentin State Prison
Charles M. Roessel (2007) – president of Diné College 
 Jim Rossi - law professor at Vanderbilt University
Brenna Sakas – Miss Arizona USA 2006 
Christopher J. Schneider – award-winning professor at Wilfrid Laurier University 
Larry Schweikart - conservative author and popular historian best known for A Patriot's History of the United States
Jimmy Siemers – professional water skier, two-time world champion
Paul Spudis – geologist and lunar scientist
Roger L. Worsley – educator; received three degrees from ASU in 1959, 1962, and 1969
Terry A. Davis - programmer and creator of the TempleOS operating system
Shaun King - civil rights activist and writer
Saskia Popescu - infectious disease specialist
Jodi Quas - Professor of Psychological Science and Nursing Science at the University of California, Irvine School of Social Ecology

Government
Jacinda Ardern - Prime Minister of New Zealand. 
Harriet C. Babbitt – Vice Chair, World Resources Institute; former U.S. Ambassador to the Organization of American States, former Deputy Administrator, U.S. Agency for International Development, and former First Lady of Arizona
Barbara Barrett – former U.S. Ambassador to Finland
Betsey Bayless – former Arizona Secretary of State
Ken Bennett – former Arizona Secretary of State
Bruce Blakeman – first Presiding Officer Nassau County NY, Commissioner Port Authority of NY/NJ
Mark Brnovich – current Arizona Attorney General
Tena Campbell – chief judge, U.S. District Court for the District of Utah
Angela Ducey – First Lady of Arizona
Doug Ducey – Governor of Arizona (2015–present); Arizona State Treasurer (2011–2015); former president and CEO of Coldstone Creamery
Terry Goddard – former Arizona Attorney General
Barry Goldwater Jr. – U.S. Congressman for California 
Michael Daly Hawkins – senior judge, U.S. Court of Appeals for the Ninth Circuit; received the Founders’ Day Alumni Achievement Award from the ASU Alumni Association in 1995
Carl Hayden – former U.S. Senator and Arizona's first Congressional Representative; Normal School graduate, class of 1896
Cecil Heftel – founder of Heftel Broadcasting; former U.S. Representative
Jane Dee Hull – former Governor of Arizona
Steve T. Kirby – former Lieutenant Governor of South Dakota
 Iyad ibn Amin Madani - Minister of Culture & Information of Saudi Arabia
Sultan bin Saeed Al Mansoori – Minister of Economy for the United Arab Emirates (UAE); received the Founders’ Day Alumni Achievement Award from the ASU Alumni Association in 2010 
Dean Martin – former State Treasurer of Arizona
Ruth McGregor – former chief justice of the Arizona Supreme Court; received the Founders’ Day Alumni Achievement Award from the ASU Alumni Association in 1998
Evan Mecham – former Governor of Arizona (1987–1988)
Harry Mitchell – former U.S. Congressman, former Mayor of Tempe, former State Senator
Ed Pastor – former U.S. Congressman from Arizona; received the Founders’ Day Alumni Achievement Award from the ASU Alumni Association in 1993
Matt Salmon – former U.S. Congressman; former Arizona gubernatorial candidate
Fatmir Sejdiu – President of Kosovo, former Visiting Scholar at ASU
David Schweikert – U.S. Congressman; former Maricopa County Treasurer; former State Representative
Kyrsten Sinema – U.S. Senator from Arizona
Susan Bitter Smith – Arizona Corporation Commission member (2013–2017); former executive director at Southwest Cable Communications Association; received the Founders’ Day Alumni Achievement Award from the ASU Alumni Association in 2003
Bob Stump – former U.S. Congressman; received the Founders’ Day Alumni Achievement Award from the ASU Alumni Association in 1996 (deceased)
Kimberly Yee – Arizona State Treasurer (2019–present); Arizona State Senate Majority Leader (2017–2019)
Peterson Zah – educator; former President of the Navajo Nation; received the Founders’ Day Alumni Achievement Award from the ASU Alumni Association in 1985
Don Tracy – chairman Illinois Republican Party and chairman of the Illinois Gaming Board
Michelle Ugenti-Rita – Arizona State Senator

Medicine and Science

 Krystal Tsosie (BS 2008, MA 2012) – geneticist and bioethicist 
 Alena Analeigh Wicker (BS 2024, MS 2024) – youngest Black person accepted into medical school and youngest person to intern at NASA

Sports

Baseball
101 ASU Sun Devils have made it to Major League Baseball, including: 

Sal Bando – former MLB player; played for the Kansas City and Oakland Athletics and Milwaukee Brewers; inducted into College Baseball Hall of Fame in 2013 (attended)
Floyd Bannister – former player for the Houston Astros, Seattle Mariners, Chicago White Sox, Kansas City Royals, California Angels, and Texas Rangers (attended)
Willie Bloomquist – MLB player for the Arizona Diamondbacks; also played for the Seattle Mariners, Kansas City Royals, and Cincinnati Reds
Barry Bonds – home run king and seven-time MVP; played for the Pittsburgh Pirates and San Francisco Giants; received the Founder's Day Alumni Achievement Award from the ASU Alumni Association in 2002 (attended)
Hubie Brooks – former player; played for the New York Mets, Montreal Expos, Los Angeles Dodgers, Anaheim Angels, and Kansas City Royals (attended)
Travis Buck – outfielder for the Houston Astros; played for the Oakland Athletics and Cleveland Indians (attended)
Alvin Davis – former player, 1984 Rookie of the Year; played for the Seattle Mariners and the California Angels
Ike Davis – player for the Pittsburgh Pirates (attended)
Mike Devereaux – former player; played for the Los Angeles Dodgers, Baltimore Orioles, Chicago White Sox, Atlanta Braves, and Texas Rangers (attended)
Tim Esmay – former Arizona State baseball coach
Mike Esposito – pitcher for the Colorado Rockies (attended)
Andre Ethier – outfielder for the Los Angeles Dodgers (attended)
Herman Frazier – deputy athletics director/chief of staff, Syracuse University; received the Founders’ Day Alumni Achievement Award from the ASU Alumni Association in 2000
Larry Gura – former All-Star pitcher; played for the Chicago Cubs, the New York Yankees and the Kansas City Royals
Eric Helfand - Major League Baseball player
Bob Horner – former player, 1978 Rookie of the Year; played for the Atlanta Braves and St. Louis Cardinals (attended)
Reggie Jackson – former player, member of the Baseball Hall of Fame, "Mr. October"; played for the Oakland Athletics, Baltimore Orioles, New York Yankees, and Anaheim Angels; received the Founder's Day Alumni Achievement Award from the ASU Alumni Association in 1974 (attended)
Mitch Jones – outfielder who played for the Atlanta Braves and Pittsburgh Pirates (attended)
Ian Kinsler – Israeli-American 4x All Star 2B for the Detroit Tigers, Texas Rangers, Boston Red Sox, and Los Angeles Angels (attended)
Jason Kipnis – player for the Cleveland Indians (attended)
Ken Landreaux – former MLB player
Mike Leake – player for the Seattle Mariners (attended)
Paul Lo Duca – former catcher; played for the Los Angeles Dodgers, Florida Marlins, New York Mets, and Washington Nationals (attended)
 Seth Martinez: MLB pitcher, made debut for Houston Astros
Rick Monday – former outfielder; Los Angeles Dodgers announcer; played for the Oakland Athletics, Chicago Cubs and Los Angeles Dodgers (attended)
Dustin Pedroia – second baseman for the Boston Red Sox, 2008 American League Most Valuable Player (attended)
Ken Phelps – radio broadcaster, former designated hitter and first baseman; played for the Kansas City Royals, Montreal Expos, Seattle Mariners, New York Yankees, Oakland Athletics, and the Cleveland Indians (attended)
Andrew Romine – MLB baseball player for the Detroit Tigers (attended)
Kevin Romine – Boston Red Sox right fielder (attended)
Dennis Sarfate – pitcher for the Fukuoka SoftBank Hawks; played for the Milwaukee Brewers, Houston Astros, and Baltimore Orioles; holds several Nippon Professional Baseball records, including most saves in a season and most by a foreign-born pitcher
 Brian Serven (born 1995), Major League Baseball catcher 
Eric Sogard – player for the Oakland A's (attended)
Spencer Torkelson - (2022) MLB first-baseman for the Detroit Tigers (attended)
Fernando Viña – ESPN analyst and former second baseman; played for the Seattle Mariners, New York Mets, Milwaukee Brewers, St. Louis Cardinals, and Detroit Tigers (attended)
Don Wakamatsu – former catcher for the Chicago White Sox and former manager of the Seattle Mariners (first Asian-American) (attended)
Brett Wallace – player for the Houston Astros (attended)

Basketball
Isaac Austin – former NBA player; played for the Utah Jazz, Miami Heat, Los Angeles Clippers, Orlando Magic, Washington Wizards and the Memphis Grizzlies (attended)
Joe Caldwell – former professional basketball forward/guard; Olympic gold medalist; played for the Detroit Pistons and the St. Louis/Atlanta Hawks and the ABA Carolina Cougars 
Ike Diogu – former NBA player; Pac-10 Player of the Year; played for the Golden State Warriors, Indiana Pacers, Portland Trail Blazers, Sacramento Kings, the Los Angeles Clippers, and the San Antonio Spurs (attended)
Luguentz Dort – Canadian NBA forward for the Oklahoma City Thunder. (attended)
James Harden – NBA guard for the Philadelphia 76ers; NBA All-Star; '11–'12 Sixth Man of the Year; NBA MVP ‘17-‘18; Olympic gold medalist; Pac-10 Player of the Year (attended)
Rico Harris - former professional basketball player for some International Basketball League teams, and later with the Harlem Globetrotters. (attended)
Lionel Hollins – head coach of Memphis Grizzlies of the NBA; former NBA guard who played for the Portland Trail Blazers, Philadelphia 76ers, San Diego Clippers, Detroit Pistons, and the Houston Rockets
Eddie House – former NBA guard; Pac-10 Player of the Year; played for the Miami Heat, Los Angeles Clippers, Milwaukee Bucks, Charlotte Bobcats, Sacramento Kings, Phoenix Suns, New Jersey Nets, Boston Celtics, and the New York Knicks (attended)
Briann January – WNBA guard for the Connecticut Sun
Egor Koulechov (born 1994) - Israeli-Russian professional basketball player for Israeli team Ironi Nahariya
Lafayette Lever ("Fat") – former NBA guard; played for the Portland Trail Blazers, Denver Nuggets and Dallas Mavericks
Alton Lister – former forward/center; played for the Milwaukee Bucks, Seattle SuperSonics, Golden State Warriors, Boston Celtics and Portland Trail Blazers (attended)
Kurt Nimphius – former forward/ center; played for the Dallas Mavericks, Los Angeles Clippers, Detroit Pistons, San Antonio Spurs, and the Philadelphia 76ers
Jeff Pendergraph (Ayers) – former NBA player for the NBA champion San Antonio Spurs, Portland Trail Blazers, and Los Angeles Clippers
Victor Rudd (born 1991) – basketball player for Maccabi Tel Aviv of the Israeli Basketball Premier League and the Euroleague
Byron Scott – NBA head coach for the Cleveland Cavaliers, New Jersey Nets, New Orleans Hornets, and the Los Angeles Lakers; former NBA guard for the Los Angeles Lakers, Indiana Pacers, and the Vancouver Grizzlies; former ESPN analyst (attended)
Romello White (born 1998) - basketball player for Hapoel Eilat of the Israeli Basketball Premier League

Football
Eric Allen – retired NFL cornerback; played for the Philadelphia Eagles, New Orleans Saints and Oakland Raiders (attended)
Adam Archuleta – former defensive safety in the NFL; played for the St. Louis Rams, Washington Redskins and Chicago Bears (attended)
Trace Armstrong – former defensive end; played for the Chicago Bears, Miami Dolphins and Oakland Raiders
Dino Babers – Head football coach at Syracuse University
Jon Baker – NFL and CFL placekicker
Mike Bercovici – quarterback; currently a free agent (attended)
Bob Breunig – former NFL player, linebacker; played with the Dallas Cowboys
Vontaze Burfict – linebacker for the Oakland Raiders (attended)
Shante Carver – former defensive end for the Dallas Cowboys
Davon Coleman – defensive tackle for the BC Lions (attended)
Aaron Cox – former wide receiver with the Los Angeles Rams and Indianapolis Colts (attended)
Curley Culp – former player defensive tackle and Pro Football Hall of Famer; played for the Kansas City Chiefs, Houston Oilers and Detroit Lions
Dexter Davis – former defensive end/linebacker; played for the Seattle Seahawks
David Fulcher – former defensive back; played for the Cincinnati Bengals and Los Angeles Raiders
Mark Gastineau – former player defensive end; played for the New York Jets (attended 1 year)
Travis Goethel – former linebacker: played for the Oakland Raiders
John F. Goodman – retired United States Marine Corps Lieutenant General; former quarterback for the New Orleans Saints
Mike Haynes – former cornerback and College and Pro Football Hall of Famer; played for the New England Patriots and Los Angeles Raiders
Todd Heap – played for the Arizona Cardinals and Baltimore Ravens.
John Henry Johnson – former fullback, Pro Football Hall of Famer; played for the San Francisco 49ers, the Detroit Lions, Pittsburgh Steelers and the Houston Oilers
Jim Jeffcoat – former defensive end; played for the Dallas Cowboys and the Buffalo Bills
John Jefferson – former wide receiver; played for the San Diego Chargers, Green Bay Packers and the Cleveland Browns
Paul Justin – retired quarterback; played for the Chicago Bears, the Indianapolis Colts, the Cincinnati Bengals and St. Louis Rams in the NFL, as well as for the Arizona Rattlers in the Arena Football League
Kyle Kingsbury – former walk-on who played in 2004, mixed martial artist in the UFC
Kyle Kosier – guard; played for the San Francisco 49ers, Detroit Lions, and Dallas Cowboys
Mark Malone – former player, quarterback; played for the Pittsburgh Steelers, San Diego Chargers and New York Jets
Dick Mansperger – former NFL executive
Randall McDaniel – former guard, College and Pro Football Hall of Famer; played for the Minnesota Vikings and Tampa Bay Buccaneers; Special Education Paraprofessional at Hilltop Primary School in Minnesota; received the Founder's Day Alumni Achievement Award from the ASU Alumni Association in 2012
Zach Miller – former NFL tight end; played for the Oakland Raiders and Seattle Seahawks
Nick Murphy – former punter; played for the Baltimore Ravens, Kansas City Chiefs and Philadelphia Eagles
Isaiah Mustafa – former wide receiver, practice squad member of the Tennessee Oilers, Oakland Raiders, Cleveland Browns and Seattle Seahawks
Brian Noble – former linebacker; played for the Green Bay Packers
Brock Osweiler – NFL quarterback; currently a free agent (attended)
Mike Pagel – former quarterback; played for the Indianapolis Colts, Cleveland Browns, and Los Angeles Rams
Jake Plummer – former quarterback; played for the Arizona Cardinals, Denver Broncos and Tampa Bay Buccaneers (attended)
Mike Pollak – former center / guard; played for the Indianapolis Colts, Carolina Panthers and Cincinnati Bengals
Keith Poole – former wide receiver; played for the New Orleans Saints and the Denver Broncos (attended)
Gerald Riggs – former running back; played for the Atlanta Falcons and Washington Redskins (attended)
Derrick Rodgers – former linebacker; played for the Miami Dolphins
Juan Roque – former offensive tackle; played for the Detroit Lions
Dan Saleaumua – former player (defensive player); played for the Detroit Lions, Kansas City Chiefs and Seattle Seahawks
Jerry Smith – former tight end; played for the Washington Redskins
Marvel Smith – former NFL player for the Pittsburgh Steelers
Phillippi Sparks – former cornerback; played for the New York Giants and Dallas Cowboys; father of pop/R&B Grammy-nominated singer Jordin Sparks (attended)
Dennis Sproul – former quarterback; played for Green Bay Packers (attended)
Terrell Suggs – linebacker for the Arizona Cardinals (attended)
Will Sutton – defensive tackle; currently a free agent
Charley Taylor – former wide receiver for the Washington Redskins, Pro Football Hall of Famer
J. T. Thomas – former wide receiver for the St. Louis Rams
Pat Tillman – former safety for the Arizona Cardinals; US Army Ranger (deceased)
Andrew Walter – former quarterback for the Oakland Raiders and New England Patriots
Danny White – College Football Hall of Fame member, former quarterback for the Dallas Cowboys, and former Arizona Rattlers coach
Wilford White – former player running back for the Chicago Bears (deceased); father of Danny White
Kyle Williams – former wide receiver for the San Francisco 49ers and son of Major League Baseball Chicago White Sox general manager Kenny Williams (attended)
Darren Woodson – former safety for Dallas Cowboys, ESPN Analyst
Louis Wright – former cornerback; played for the Denver Broncos

Hockey

Joey Daccord – Goaltender for the Seattle Kraken. (attended)
Auston Matthews – Forward for the Toronto Maple Leafs. First overall pick in the 2016 NHL Draft, Calder Trophy winner, 2-time 40-goal scorer. Did not attend in person.

Golf
Danielle Ammaccapane – professional golfer (attended)
Alejandro Cañizares – professional golfer
JoAnne Carner – retired professional golfer; played on the LPGA tour from 1970 to 2005; received the Founders’ Day Alumni Achievement Award from the ASU Alumni Association in 1978
Jim Carter – professional golfer
Paul Casey – professional golfer (attended)
Heather Farr – professional golfer (attended)
Per-Ulrik Johansson – professional golfer, six-time European Tour tournament winner (attended)
Billy Mayfair – professional golfer
Phil Mickelson – professional golfer, three-time Masters Champion, 2012 inductee to World Golf Hall of Fame; received the Founder's Day Alumni Achievement Award from the ASU Alumni Association in 2010
Anna Nordqvist – professional golfer (attended)
Grace Park – professional golfer (attended)
Pat Perez – professional golfer
Tom Purtzer – professional golfer
Jeff Quinney – professional golfer
Jon Rahm – professional golfer
Chez Reavie – professional golfer
Howard Twitty – professional golfer

Olympics
Pablo Martín Abal – swam in the 2000 Summer Olympics for Argentina
Reema Abdo – won the bronze medal in the 4 × 100 m Medley Relay in the 1984 Summer Olympics
Carolyn Adel –swam in the 1996 and 2000 Olympic Games
Omolade Akinremi – competed in track and field at the 1996 Olympic Games
Ime Akpan – competed in track and field at the 1996 Olympic Games
Kyle Alcorn – competed in track and field at the 2012 Olympic Games
Seth Amoo – competed in track and field at the 2008 Olympic Games
Gail Amundrud – won a bronze medal for 4 × 100 meter freestyle medley in swimming in the 1976 Summer Olympics
Ross Anderson – competed in swimming at the 1988 Summer Olympics
Andy Astbury – competed in swimming at the 1980 and 1984 Olympic Games; won a bronze medal for the 4 × 200 meter freestyle relay during the 1984 games
Joann Baker – competed in swimming at the 1976 Summer Olympics
Lewis Banda – competed in track and field at the 2004 and 2008 Olympic Games 
Petra Banović – competed in swimming at the 2000 and 2004 Olympic Games
Jay Barrs – won gold and silver medals in archery at the 1988 Summer Olympics
Jacinta Bartholomew – competed in track and field at the 1984 Summer Olympics
Melissa Belote – won three gold medals in swimming at the 1972 Summer Olympics
Richard Bera – competed in swimming at the 1988, 1996, and 2000 Olympic Games
Peter Berggren – competed in swimming at the 1984 Summer Olympics
Constantin Blaha – competed in diving at the 2008 Summer Olympics
Eric Boateng – competed in basketball at the 2012 Summer Olympics 
Gary Bohay – competed in wrestling at the 1988 Summer Olympics
Amanda Borden – 1996 Summer Olympics team gold medal winner in gymnastics; received the Founders’ Day Alumni Achievement Award from the ASU Alumni Association in 2011
Mark Bradshaw – competed in diving at the 2004 and 2008
Ronald Brown – won a gold medal for the 4 × 400 meter track relay at the 1984 Summer Olympics
Joe Caldwell – won a gold medal in basketball at the 1964 Summer Olympics
Kelsey Campbell – competed in wrestling at the 2012 Summer Olympics
Michael Campbell – competed in track and field at the 2004 Summer Olympics
Henry Carr – winner of two gold medals at the 1964 Summer Olympics (attended)
Leslie Cliff – won a silver medal in the 400 meter individual medley relay at the 1972 Summer Olympics
Neil Cochran – won two bronze medals at the 1984 Summer Olympics in swimming events: one in the 4 × 200 meter freestyle relay and one for the 200 meter individual medley relay
Frank Covelli – competed in track and field at the 1964 and 1968 Olympic Games
Tracy Cox – competed in diving at the 1984, 1988, and 1992 Olympic Games
Attila Czene – won a gold medal for swimming in the 200 meter individual medley event at the 1996 Summer Olympics
Troy Dalbey – winner of two gold medals at the 1988 Summer Olympics in swimming (attended)
Desiree Davila – competed in the marathon at the 2012 Summer Olympics 
Robert Delgado – competed in swimming at the 1996 and 2000 Olympic Games
Leslie Deniz – 1984 Summer Olympics won silver medal in women's discus (attended)
Ike Diogu – competed in basketball at the 2012 Summer Olympics
Bobby Douglass – competed in wrestling at the 1964 and 1968 Olympic Games
Paul Easter – won a bronze medal in swimming for the 4 × 200 meter freestyle relay at the 1984 Summer Olympics 
Elina Eggers – competed in diving at the 2008 Summer Olympics
Rob Eiter – competed in wrestling at the 1996 Summer Olympics
Dwayne Evans – won a bronze medal in track for the 200 meter dash event at the 1976 Summer Olympics 
Pål Arne Fagernes – competed in track and field at the 1996 and 2000 Olympic Games
Herman Frazier – won a gold medal in track the 4 × 400 meter relay and a bronze medal in the 400 meter event at the 1976 Summer Olympics 
Ronald Freeman – won a gold medal as part of the 4 × 400 meter relay team and a bronze medal in the 400 meter dash at the 1968 Summer Olympics
Benny Garcia – competed in track and field at the 1956 Summer Olympics
Cheryl Gibson – won a silver medal in the 400m Individual Medley in the 1976 Summer Olympics
Brian Gyetko – competed in tennis at the 1992 Summer Olympics
James Harden – won a gold medal for basketball at the 2012 Summer Olympics
Steve Hardy – competed in swimming at the 1976 Summer Olympics
Amy Hastings – competed in track and field at the 2012 Summer Olympics 
Ricardo Héber – competed in track and field at the 1948 and 1952 Olympic Games
Dan Henderson – competed in wrestling at the 1992 and 1996 Olympic Games
Jan Henne-Hawkins – won three gold medals, one silver medal, and one bronze medal in swimming at the 1968 Summer Olympics
David Holderbach – competed in swimming at the 1988 and 1992 Olympic Games
Paul Howe – won a bronze medal in swimming for the 4 × 200 meter freestyle medley at the 1984 Summer Olympics
Justin Huish – won two gold medals in archery at the 1996 Summer Olympics
Ahmed Hussein – competed in swimming at the 2000 and 2004 Olympic Games 
Nick Hysong – won a gold medal in the pole vault event at the 2000 Summer Olympics
Andy Jameson – won a gold medal in swimming in the 100 meter butterfly event at the 1984 Summer Olympics
Ivan Jean-Marie – competed in track and field at the 1996 Summer Olympics
Chris Jogis – competed in badminton at the 1992 Summer Olympics
Camilla Johansson – competed in swimming at the 2000 Summer Olympics
Jacquelyn Johnson – competed in track and field at the 2008 Summer Olympics
Zeke Jones – won one silver medal in wrestling at the 1992 Summer Olympics
Dávid Kolozár – competed in swimming at the 2004 Summer Olympics
Ágnes Kovács – won a gold medal in swimming for the 200 meter breaststroke in the 2000 Summer Olympics, and a silver medal in the 200 meter breaststroke in 1996 Summer Olympics
Benny Lee (de.) – competed in badminton at the 1992 Summer Olympics
Amy LePeilbet – gold medal winner for the United States women's national soccer team at the 2012 Summer Olympics
Nelson Lincoln – competed in shooting at the 1960 Summer Olympics
Therese Lundin – competed in swimming at the 1992 Summer Olympics
Maicel Malone-Wallace – won a gold medal in track for the 4 × 400 meter relay at the 1996 Summer Olympics
Riley McCormick – competed in diving at the 2012 Summer Olympics
Rick McKinney – won silver medals for archery at the 1984 and 1988 Olympic Games
Gavin Meadows – competed in swimming at the 2004 Summer Olympics
Cristiano Michelena – competed in swimming at the 1988 and 1992 Olympic Games 
Bill Miller – won a silver medal for the javelin event at the 1952 Summer Olympics
Kendis Moore – competed in swimming at the 1968 Summer Olympics
Mark Murro – competed in track and field (javelin) at the 1968 Summer Olympics
Lynn Nelson – competed in track and field at the 1988 Summer Olympics 
Gal Nevo – competed in swimming at the 2008 and 2012 Summer Olympics|2012
Eva Nyberg – competed in swimming at the 1988 and 1992 Olympic Games
Mikael Örn – won a bronze medal for swimming in the 4 × 100 meter freestyle relay at the 1984 Summer Olympics
Andrew Parker – competed in track and field at the 1988 Summer Olympics
Anders Peterson – competed in swimming at the 1984 Summer Olympics
Ann Peterson – won a bronze medal for diving at the 1968 Summer Olympics
Joel Phillip – competed in track and field at the 2008 Summer Olympics
Dwight Phillips – won a gold medal for the long jump at the 2004 Summer Olympics
Eduardo Piccinini – competed in swimming at the 1992 Summer Olympics
Joona Puhakka – competed in diving at the 2008 Summer Olympics
Trevell Quinley – competed in track and field at the 2008 Summer Olympics
Renato Ramalho – competed in swimming at the 1988 and 1992 Olympic Games
Shawn Redhage – represented Australia at the 2008 Beijing Summer Olympic Games in basketball
Keith Russell – competed in diving at the 1968 Summer Olympics
Francisco Sánchez – competed in swimming at the 1996 and 2000 Olympic Games
Marco Sanchez – competed in wrestling at the 1996 Summer Olympics
Donald Sanford – competed in track and field and 2012 Summer Olympics 
Townsend Saunders – won a silver medal for wrestling at the 1996 Summer Olympics
Lou Scott – competed in track and field at the 1968 Summer Olympics
Coleen Sommer – competed in track and field at the 1988 Summer Olympics
Malcolm "Mal" Spence – won a bronze medal at the 1960 Summer Olympics for track and field, in the 4 × 400 meter relay event
Mel Spence – competed in track and field at the 1956 and 1964 Olympic Games
Ria Stalman – won a gold medal for the discus at the 1984 Summer Olympics 
Florencia Szigeti – competed in swimming at the 2000 and 2004 Olympic Games
Richard Tapper – competed in swimming at the 1992 Summer Olympics
Lynda Tolbert-Goode – competed in track and field at the 1992 and 1996 Olympic Games
María Trujillo – competed in track and field at the 1984 Summer Olympics 
Tammy Webb-Lilley – won a bronze medal for volleyball at the 1992 Summer Olympics
Rowie Webster – won a bronze medal for water polo at the 2012 Summer Olympics 
Ryan Whiting – competed in track and field at the 2012 Summer Olympics 
Mary "Patsy" Willard – won a bronze medal in diving at the 1964 Summer Olympics
Ulis Williams – won a gold medal in track for the 4 × 400 meter relay at the 1964 Summer Olympics
Alison Williamson – won a bronze medal for individual archery at the 2004 Summer Olympics
Bernie Wrightson – won a gold medal for diving at the 1968 Summer Olympics
Mel Zajac – competed in swimming at the 1976 Summer Olympics
Richárd Bohus - competed in swimming at the 2012 and 2016 Summer Olympics
Katarina Simonovic - competed in swimming at the 2016 Summer Olympics
Anna Olasz - competed in open water swimming at the 2016 Summer Olympics

Soccer
 Liz Bogus – forward for FC Kansas City in the National Women's Soccer League
 Amy LePeilbet – defender for the Chicago Red Stars in the National Women's Soccer League and United States women's national soccer team

Tennis

 Paulina Peled, nee Peisachov (born 1950) - Israeli tennis player

Track

Donald Sanford – American-Israeli Olympic sprinter

Mixed martial arts
 Ryan Bader – MMA fighter, winner of The Ultimate Fighter 8; former competitor in the UFC, current Bellator MMA Light Heavyweight Champion
 C.B. Dollaway – state champion wrestler; JUCO National Champion; NCAA D-1 All-American for ASU; professional mixed martial artist competing in the UFC's Middleweight Division
 Don Frye – former MMA fighter for Pride Fighting Championships and the UFC (attended)
 Dan Henderson – Olympic team member for Greco-Roman wrestling; former MMA fighter, won both the Strikeforce Light Heavyweight Championship and the Pride Welterweight and Middleweight Championship, competed for titles in the UFC 
 Bubba Jenkins – 2011 National Champion at 157 lbs, professional MMA fighter
 Zeke Jones – competed on the 1988 NCAA Wrestling Championship team, Olympic silver medalist (1992) and World Wrestling Champion (1991)
 Matthew Lopez (attended) – professional MMA fighter 
 John Moraga – two-time Freestyle All-American wrestler; mixed martial artist fighting in the UFC
 Anthony Robles – 2011 National Champion at 125 lbs., ESPY award-winner, author of Unstoppable, 2013 appointee to the President's Council on Fitness, Sports, and Nutrition
 Frankie Saenz – professional mixed martial artist, UFC Bantamweight (attended)
 Townsend Saunders – 1996 Olympic silver medalist 
 Dan Severn – Olympic team alternate and NCAA All-American wrestler; former professional mixed martial artist and Professional Wrestler ("The Beast"); UFC Hall of Fame member
 Aaron Simpson – All-American in 1996 and 98; retired MMA fighter, formerly with the UFC
 Clifford Starks – MMA competitor, in both Bellator and the UFC
 James Terry – professional MMA fighter
 Cain Velasquez – two-time All-American wrestler at heavyweight 5th in 2005, 4th in 2006; professional MMA fighter, former UFC Heavyweight Champion, first UFC champion of Mexican-American descent
 Patrick Williams – professional MMA fighter for the UFC

 E-sports 
 Sean Gares – professional Counter-Strike'' player; in game leader of Cloud9, 2013–2015; formerly a member of Complexity and of Area 51

Notes and references

External links
List of alumni

Arizona State University alumni